The Barnwell-Gough House, also known as Old Barnwell House, is a house built in Beaufort, South Carolina in 1789.

It was listed on the National Register of Historic Places in 1972.  It is included in Beaufort Historic District, which is a National Historic Landmark District.

References

External links

Historic American Buildings Survey in South Carolina
Houses on the National Register of Historic Places in South Carolina
National Register of Historic Places in Beaufort County, South Carolina
Houses in Beaufort, South Carolina
Historic district contributing properties in South Carolina